"Movimento lento" is a song by Italian singer Annalisa with featuring vocals by Federico Rossi. It was written by Annalisa, Jacopo Ettorre, Eugenio Maimone, Leonardo Grillotti and Merk & Kremont.

It was released by Warner Music Italy on 28 May 2021 as the second single from the re-issue of her seventh studio album Nuda10. The song peaked at number 8 on the FIMI Singles Chart and was certified double platinum in Italy.

Music video
The music video of "Movimento lento" was directed by Mauro Russo and released onto YouTube on 8 June 2021.

Track listing

Charts

Certifications

References

2021 singles
2021 songs
Annalisa songs
Songs written by Annalisa